= Géza Gábor Simon =

- Born: 1 May 1947; Budapest, Hungary
- Occupation(s): music historian, record historian, music journalist, producer, librarian, discographer
- Years active: 1964–

Géza Gábor Simon (born in Budapest on 1 May 1947) is a music and record historian, journalist, producer, librarian, and an acknowledged discographer.

== Biography ==
His secondary education lasted from 1961 to 1965, he graduated from Egressy Gábor Gimnázium, Budapest. From 1988 to 1990 as a beneficiary of Soros scholarships he was able to study Hungarian jazz history in Austria, West Germany, Switzerland, Italy, France, the Netherlands, as well as in the metropolitan archives of Budapest, in the Hungarian National Archive, and in various private collections. He continues to publish the results of his ongoing research work.

His musical career started in 1964. From 1967 to 1997 as an editor of the Hungarian Radio he covered the jazz and gramophone record scene. From 1970 he keeps authoring articles on jazz in 50 Hungarian, Austrian, German and Polish journals. He produced 209 jazz, classical and contemporary LP/CD/MC records (contributing as an editor, producer, lyricist, translator, photographer, cover designer, and discographer). From 1985 to 1987 he was an associate of the label Hungaroton Archívum, and from 1987 to 1989 he was the artistic director of Pannonton, the first Hungarian private record label. Since 1991 he is the chairman of the Hungarian Jazz Research Association (Magyar Jazzkutatási Társaság, the world's only national jazz research society). Since 2006, he has been the chief editor of the association's website.

== Work ==
Simon is a researcher and collector of books, records, and other items primarily related to musicians either performing in Hungary or of Hungarian descent. From the 1990s until the 2010s he published several references and specialist books related to jazz and other musical genres, next to discographies, a multitude of articles and other contributions. He is a lecturer in music libraries, schools and clubs. His presentations and series of lectures cover various musical topicsd. He also contributed to radio and TV programs in Hungary and Austria.

=== Awards ===
- "Jazz record of the year" in Germany (1985) (Jazz and Hot Dance in Hungary 1912-1949. Harlequin HQ 2015)
- First-time award in the record competition staged by the Hungarian Musicians' Association (Magyar Zeneművészek Szövetsége, 1989) (Binder-Süle: For You. Two Pianos. Pannonton JL 117)
- Artisjus Award (2004)

=== Memberships and positions ===
- Internationale Gesellschaft für Jazzforschung, Graz, member (1967-)
- Magyar Könyvtárosok Egyesülete, musical section (1987-)
- Magyar Jazzkutatási Társaság, founding member, chairman (1991-)
- Jazz Oktatási és Kutatási Alapítvány, chairman of advisory board (1992-)
- Magyar Zenetudományi és Zenekritikai Társaság, founding member (1993-)
- Akusztikus Gitárzene Közhasznú Egyesület, member (2002-)
- Gesellschaft für Historische Tonträger, Wien, member (2008-)
- Pécsi Hangtár (Marton-Bajnai) Alapítvány a Nemzeti Hangtárért, chairman of advisory board (2011-2016)

== Sources ==
- Béla Stenczer (editor): "Egy könyv visszhangja." [Magyar jazzlemezek 1912-1984 / Hungarian Jazz Records 1912-1984.]. Pécs, July 1987.
- Jávorszky Béla Szilárd: Simon Géza Gábor - Meddig jazz a jazz? Új Magyarország, March 21, 1992.
- Kálmán Fekete: Jazz - blues kutatók, szervezők és médiaképviselők: Simon Géza Gábor - Budapest. In: Uő.: Első magyar blueskönyv: riportok, vallomások, tanulmányok és biográfiák. Pécs, 1996. p. 438-449. ISBN 963-367-164-7
- Marton László Távolodó: "Csökken a színvonal" (Simon Géza Gábor jazz researcher). Magyar Narancs, November 18, 1999.
- Henri Broms: Jazzin semiotiikkaa. Helsinki 2007. ISBN 978-952-5431-17-9
- Who is Who Magyarországon, 11th edition. Budapest, 2013.
- Jávorszky Béla Szilárd: A magyar jazz története. Kossuth Kiadó, Budapest, 2014. ISBN 978-963-09-7992-4 (pages 10, 11, 39, 41-46, 52, 53, 56, 61, 95, 123, 130-133, 140, 141, 144, 148, 187, 201, 223, 224)
- Iván Csaba: Jazztérkép. Publio Kiadó, Győr, 2015. ISBN 978-963-397-377-6
- Simon Géza Gábor: "Szösszenetek" a jazz- és a hanglemeztörténetből. Gramofon Könyvek, Budapest, 2016. ISBN 978-615-80474-1-8
- www.pannonjazz.hu
- www.jazzkutatas.eu
- www.gramophone-anno.eu
